The Hussey family, after 1066, settled in Dorset, but were also found in Berkshire, Wiltshire and Somerset. In medieval England the name of Hussey was generally spelt as 'Hose', evolving into Hoese, Huse, Husee, and thence to Hussey, and in Latin was first known as Hosatus.

Anglo-Normans